Loo Hor-kuay (20 August 1934 – 10 October 2009), also known as George Hughko Lo, was a basketball player who played as a center.

Biography
Born in Dongguan in central Guangdong province, China, he was the son of a wealthy land owner, Lo Kok Man. He attended Pui Ching Middle School (Guangzhou) in 1948 and moved to Hong Kong in 1950 where he went to Pui Ching Middle School (Hong Kong). There he helped reorganize the Iron Spear basketball team and began to hone his skills as a basketball player. During the Korean War, the United States Seventh Fleet visited Hong Kong, and the Iron Spears were invited to play in their friendship basketball league. The Iron Spears would eventually take on the name Red and Blue. In 1952, the Red and Blue participated in the Hong Kong Basketball League's Six Finals invitational where Loo scored a career-high 46 points in a 92–46 victory against the Shun Lian.

Graduating high school in 1953, he went to play for Hong Kong's Team Self Reliance and gained international recognition with his left hook shot while playing at South China AA Stadium. Two original Iron Spears players were selected for the national team; Loo representing Hong Kong and He Guowei representing mainland China. Due to the political situation at the time, the National Olympic Committee selected Taiwan to represent China, and as a result, only Loo was selected to compete as part of the Republic of China's squad at the 1956 Summer Olympics. He continued his studies at National Taiwan University  as an overseas Chinese student. Loo turned down Yi Kuo-juei's offer to play at the 1960 ABC Championship to focus on his academics, and graduated in 1961 from the National Taiwan University's Department of Mechanical Engineering. At the 1962 Asian Games he represented Hong Kong.

Loo died on 10 October 2009. On 4 December 2009, during the 120th anniversary of the Pui Ching Middle School (Guangzhou), the Red and Blue played on their home basketball court in the Loo Hor-Kuay Memorial Cup in his honor.

References

External links
 

1934 births
2009 deaths
Chinese men's basketball players
Basketball players from Guangdong
Taiwanese people from Guangdong
Sportspeople from Guangzhou
Hong Kong men's basketball players
Taiwanese men's basketball players
Olympic basketball players of Taiwan
Basketball players at the 1956 Summer Olympics
National Taiwan University alumni
National Taiwan University of Science and Technology alumni
Basketball players at the 1962 Asian Games
Republic of China men's national basketball team players